Peter Goudinoff (born March 28, 1941) is an American politician who served in the Arizona House of Representatives from the 11th district from 1977 to 1993 and in the Arizona Senate from the 11th district from 1993 to 1997.

References

1941 births
Living people
Democratic Party members of the Arizona House of Representatives
Democratic Party Arizona state senators